The CRAM diet (cereal, rice, applesauce, and milk) is a short term dietary treatment for diarrhea and gastroenteritis. The CRAM diet has more complete protein and fat content than the BRAT diet.

Recent research
The use of cereals, rice and milk as a stop-gap eating plan for stomach upset, has been validated as a more effective remedy to manage diarrhea than BRAT by recent research in hospitals in South America and Asia.

According to John Snyder, M.D., professor of pediatrics at the University of California at San Francisco Medical Center and a member of the American Academy of Pediatrics subcommittee on treating acute diarrhea:

Need for additional hydration
Due to severe dehydration caused by both diarrhea and gastroenteritis, the CRAM eating plan should be combined with oral rehydration therapy (ORT) through the administration of liquids (e.g. Gatorade, Pedialyte) or food-based fluids (such as broth or gruels) to replace loss of fluids.

According to John Snyder, it's essential to combine the CRAM diet with an electrolyte-replacement drink. In addition, contact your doctor immediately if the diarrhea symptoms remain severe or if your child exhibits any symptoms of dehydration, such as dry mouth, lack of urination, listlessness, and rapid heart rate.

Alternatives
An alternative to the CRAM diet is the BRAT diet, which consists of bananas, rice, applesauce, and toast, the BRATT diet, which consists of bananas, rice, applesauce, toast, and tea, and the BRATTY diet which consists of bananas, rice, applesauce, toast, tea, and yogurt.

References

External links 
CRAM Diet - Fitness website

Diets